Inzersdorf im Kremstal is a municipality in the district of Kirchdorf an der Krems in the Austrian state of Upper Austria.

Geography
Inzersdorf lies in the Krems valley in the Traunviertel. About 30 percent of the municipality is forest, and 59 percent is farmland.

References

Cities and towns in Kirchdorf an der Krems District